Leyendas Mexicanas (2018) ("Mexican Legends") was a professional wrestling super card show that was held on September 16, 2016 in Arena México in Mexico City, Mexico. . The show will be produced and scripted by the Mexican professional wrestling promotion Consejo Mundial de Lucha Libre (CMLL; Spanish for "World Wrestling Council").  The show celebrated the history of lucha libre in Mexico and saw the return of several wrestlers who did not work for CMLL on a regular basis. Three out of the six matches on the show featured non-CMLL wrestlers invited for the lucha libre celebration.

Production

Background
The Mexican wrestling company Consejo Mundial de Lucha Libre (Spanish for "World Wrestling Council"; CMLL) first held a show under the name Leyendas Mexicanas ("Mexican Legends") in September 2016, The Leyendas Mexicanas shows feature various lucha libre "legends" and celebrates the history of CMLL. While the name was not specifically used until 2016 CMLL has often held shows featuring and honoring "legends" of Lucha Libre, especial for anniversary shows such as Arena Coliseo 70th Anniversary Show, Blue Panther 40th Anniversary Show, Atlantis 35th Anniversary Show, Negro Casas 40th Anniversary Show that all featured "legends" booked by CMLL for special appearances.

Storylines
The event featured six professional wrestling matches with different wrestlers involved in pre-existing scripted feuds, plots and storylines. Wrestlers portray as either heels (referred to as rudos in Mexico, those that portray the "bad guys") or faces (técnicos in Mexico, the "good guy" characters) as they followed a series of tension-building events, which culminate in a wrestling match or series of matches.

Results

References

2016 in professional wrestling
2016 in Mexico
CMLL Leyendas Mexicanas
September 2016 events in Mexico
Events in Mexico City